Edgar Thomas Larner (1869 in Norwich, Norfolk, England – 1930 in Hackney, London, England), his occupation was that of engineer/scientist for the GPO (General Post Office) Engineering-Telephones. In those days the GPO was a part of the Civil Service, so he was a civil servant. He was a television and radio experimenter and pioneer. He also taught at the Hackney Institute, London.  He was a friend of both John Logie Baird and Philo Farnsworth. He died in 1930 at the age of 61 in Hackney, London, England.

Published articles and books
 Radio and High Frequency Currents.  London, 1923.  Series (Lockwood’s Technical Manuals.)  
 Alternating Currents ... Including "The Principles of Alternating Currents," etc.  London, 1908, 1915,1923,1929 . (Lockwood’s Technical Manuals.)
 Crystal Sets, etc.  A. Rogers & Co.: London, (1924.)
 Radio and High Frequency Currents ... Second edition, enlarged.  V. C. Lockwood & Son: London, 1925. 
 Valve Sets: construction and maintenance.  Rogers & Co.: London, 1925. 
 Practical Television, etc. (With plates.) & foreword by close friend John Logie Baird  Ernest Benn: London, 1928.
 Practical Television, etc. 2nd edition (With plates.) & foreword by close friend John Logie Baird Ernest Benn: London Van Nostrand New York, 1928 
 Present-Day Valve Sets. Construction and maintenance.  Rogers & Co.: London, (1930.)

References
www.edgarlarner.org.uk
 The British Library

1869 births
1930 deaths
English electrical engineers
English inventors
Writers from Norwich